"The Last Messiah" is a 1933 essay by the Norwegian philosopher Peter Wessel Zapffe. One of his most significant works, this approximately 10 pages long essay would later be expanded upon in Zapffe’s book, On the Tragic, and, as a theory describes a reinterpretation of Friedrich Nietzsche's Übermensch. Zapffe believed that existential crisis or angst in humanity was the result of an overly evolved intellect, and that people overcome this by "artificially limiting the content of consciousness."

The human condition
Zapffe views the human condition as tragically overdeveloped, calling it "a biological paradox, an abomination, an absurdity, an exaggeration of disastrous nature." Zapffe viewed the world as beyond humanity's need for meaning, unable to provide any of the answers to the fundamental existential questions.

Throughout the essay, Zapffe alludes to Nietzsche, "the poster case, as it were, of seeing too much for sanity."

After placing the source of anguish in human intellect, Zapffe then sought as to why humanity simply didn't just perish. He concluded humanity "performs, to extend a settled phrase, a more or less self-conscious repression of its damaging surplus of consciousness" and that this was "a requirement of social adaptability and of everything commonly referred to as healthy and normal living." He provided four defined mechanisms of defense that allowed an individual to overcome their burden of intellect.

Remedies against panic

Isolation is the first method Zapffe noted. It is defined as "a fully arbitrary dismissal from consciousness of all disturbing and destructive thought and feeling". He cites "One should not think, it is just confusing" as an example.
Anchoring, according to Zapffe, is the "fixation of points within, or construction of walls around, the liquid fray of consciousness". The anchoring mechanism provides individuals a value or an ideal that allows them to focus their attentions in a consistent manner. Zapffe compared this mechanism to Norwegian playwright Henrik Ibsen's concept of the life-lie from the play The Wild Duck, where the family has achieved a tolerable modus vivendi by ignoring the skeletons and by permitting each member to live in a dreamworld of his own. Zapffe also applied the anchoring principle to society, and stated "God, the Church, the State, morality, fate, the laws of life, the people, the future" are all examples of collective primary anchoring firmaments. He noted flaws in the principle's ability to properly address the human condition, and warned against the despair provoked resulting from discovering one's anchoring mechanism was false. Another shortcoming of anchoring is conflict between contradicting anchoring mechanisms, which Zapffe posits will bring one to destructive nihilism.
Distraction is when "one limits attention to the critical bounds by constantly enthralling it with impressions." Distraction focuses all of one's energy on a task or idea to prevent the mind from turning in on itself.
Sublimation is the refocusing of energy away from negative outlets, toward positive ones.

The last messiah
Zapffe concluded that "As long as humankind recklessly proceeds in the fateful delusion of being biologically fated for triumph, nothing essential will change." Humankind will get increasingly desperate until 'the last messiah' arrives, "the man who, as the first of all, has dared strip his soul naked and submit it alive to the outmost thought of the lineage, the very idea of doom. A man who has fathomed life and its cosmic ground, and whose pain is the Earth's collective pain." Zapffe compares his messiah to Moses, but ultimately rejects the precept to "be fruitful, and multiply, and replenish the earth," by saying "Know yourselves – be infertile, and let the earth be silent after ye."

Influence
In his book The Conspiracy Against the Human Race, horror writer and philosopher Thomas Ligotti refers frequently to "The Last Messiah" and quotes sections of the essay, using Zapffe's work as an example of philosophical pessimism.

See also
 Antinatalism
 Nihilism

Notes

External links
 Peter Wessel Zapffe. "The Last Messiah", trans. Gisle R. Tangenes.
 Peter Wessel Zapffe. "The Last Messiah", trans. Peter Reed & David Rothenberg.

1933 essays
Philosophy essays
Works about philosophical pessimism